Blackitude Museum is an ethnographic museum in Yaoundé; Cameroon. The museum project began in March 1998 from a commitment of its founding president Her Majesty Ngo Nab. Fo I NANA Agnes Sunjio through her deep desire to save what remains of the artistic heritage in Cameroon. As a member of the royal family Bahouoc (Department of Nde in the western province of Cameroon), she carefully protected and preserved collections of art objects which were bequeathed by both her father and by kings of other chiefdoms, such as Bamileke Plateau of western Cameroon.

History

The  Blackitude Museum is a private museum created in 2000 by Her Majesty Queen Nana Agnes after receiving important parts of the collection from her father, who was the traditional ruler of the Western Region in Cameroon (Grass Field). The rest of the collections are constituted through  donation and purchase. Prehistoric Lithic artifacts were collected in 2009, 2010, 2011, and 2012 during  field researches in the Western  Region of Cameroon. Some of them, such as scrapers and tips of arrows, are  copies of original lithic tools collected from the archeological laboratories in Portugal by the curator Apollinaire Kaji  in 2012.

Collection

In addition to the collections of the royal treasury received in 1982 after the death of her father, Fo Nab Ngo I has increased the collection to over 2,070 works of art. The collection and documentation of these works has helped to create a framework for both the protection and dissemination of Cameroonian art. Several different themes are present in the museum's permanent exhibitions.

Governance

The museum is run by a board of trustees consisting of seven individuals:
 Chair person: Dr Sunjio Eric,
 Founder: Her Majesty Queen Nana Agnes Fo Nab Ngo I., 
 General Director: Tchuisseu Nana Christian, 
 Treasurer: Chantal Djomen, 
 Secretary: Ateba Ossende Ghislain, 
 Scientific coordinator: Professor Joseph-Marie Essomba,
 Vice-coordinator: Kaji Appolinaire.

Building

It is situated in the center of the city of Yaoundé, the political capital city of Cameroon. The museum is housed in an old building that was modified to create space for exhibitions and other services. Currently, it is still under renovation to meet the standards of a museum.

References 

Museums in Cameroon
Yaoundé
Cultural infrastructure completed in 2000
Ethnographic museums in Africa